Alvdal is a municipality in Innlandet county, Norway. It is located in the traditional district of Østerdalen. The administrative centre of the municipality is the village of Alvdal. Other villages include Barkald, Plassmoen, and Strømmen. The municipality is located to the south of Tynset, north and west of Rendalen, north of Stor-Elvdal, and east of Folldal.

The Rørosbane railway and the Norwegian National Road 3 both pass through Alvdal.

The  municipality is the 124th largest by area out of the 356 municipalities in Norway. Alvdal is the 260th most populous municipality in Norway with a population of 2,445.

General information
In 1864, the parish of Lille-Elvdal (later renamed "Alvdal") was separated from Tynset Municipality to become a separate municipality of its own. Initially, the new municipality had a population of 3,216. On 1 January 1914, the western part of Alvdal (population: 2,284) was separated to become the new Folldal Municipality. This left Alvdal with 2,135 residents.

Name
The area was historically known as Elvdalen or Øvre Elvdalen. Thus the name means "(upper) river valley", referring to the upper part of the Glåma river valley. When the municipality was established in 1864, it was named Lille Elvdalen, which meant "Little" Elvdalen in order to distinguish it from the nearby Store Elvedalen municipality ("the large Elvedalen"). In 1918, the name was changed to Alvdal, a shortened version of the old name using a local dialect spelling.

Coat of arms
The coat of arms was granted on 25 November 1988. The arms show the front ends of two silver skis on a blue background. They represent the history and importance of skiing in the area. One of the oldest skis discovered by archeologists in Norway was found in Alvdal.

Churches
The Church of Norway has one parish within the municipality of Alvdal. It is part of the Nord-Østerdal prosti (deanery) in the Diocese of Hamar.

Geography
Alvdal is bordered by Tynset to the north, Rendalen to the east and south, Stor-Elvdal to the south, and Folldal to the west. Another mountain in Alvdal is Tronfjell. The lake Savalen is partially located in Alvdal. The rivers Sivilla and Glåma both flow through the municipality. The Jutulhogget canyon is located in this municipality as well.

Economy
Agriculture and forestry are the most important industries in Alvdal. As of 2022, the municipality has decided not to continue renting land to a company that does bitcoin mining; no jobs were created from that enterprise - however, a local company did service work on occasion.

Legal liability: the municipality is being sued (as of 2023) for Norwegian kroner 4 million, by the operator of the former bitcoin mining facility (on municipal property).

Government
All municipalities in Norway, including Alvdal, are responsible for primary education (through 10th grade), outpatient health services, senior citizen services, unemployment and other social services, zoning, economic development, and municipal roads. The municipality is governed by a municipal council of elected representatives, which in turn elects a mayor.  The municipality falls under the Østre Innlandet District Court and the Eidsivating Court of Appeal.

Municipal council
The municipal council  of Alvdal is made up of 17 representatives that are elected to four year terms. The party breakdown of the council is as follows:

Mayor

The mayors of Alvdal:
1864-1865: Fritz Emil Aas
1866-1873: Morten Mortensen
1874-1881: Fritz Emil Aas 
1882-1883: Johan Steien 
1884-1891: Morten Mortensen
1892-1893: Johan Steien
1894-1895: Morten Sandvold 
1896-1898: P. Randmæl
1899-1901: Jacob Stamoen
1902-1904: P. Randmæl
1905-1907: Haldo Müller 
1908-1910: P. Randmæl 
1911-1916: Per Hoel
1917-1919: P. Randmæl 
1920-1922: Per Hoel 
1923-1925: Arne Mellesmo
1926-1931: Per Hoel 
1932-1934: Martin Müller
1935-1942: Olav Nyeggen
1942-1945: Embret Mellesmo
1946-1955: Harald Reinertsen
1956-1963: Eivind Kveberg 
1963-1967: Lars Holen 
1968-1969: Oddgeir Skarpsno  
1970-1971: Asmund Westgård 
1972-1979: Kåre Blystad 
1980-1983: Per Arnfinn Bergebakken (Sp)
1984-1991: Sverre Dalen (Sp)
1991-1995: Sverre Sørbø (Sp) 
1995-1999: Per Hvamstad (Sp)
1999-2007: Svein Borkhus (Ap)
2007-2011: Olov Grøtting (Sp)
2011-2015: Svein Borkhus (Ap)
2015-2019: Johnny Hagen (Ap)
2019–present: Mona Murud (Sp)

Notable residents 

 Ivar Mortensson-Egnund (1857–1934) a Norwegian author, journalist, theologian, researcher, translator, writer, philosopher and advocate of nynorsk
 Lars Olsen Aukrust (1886–1965) a Norwegian farmer and politician
 Arvid Nilssen (1913–1976) a Norwegian actor, revue artist, singer and comedian 
 Kjell Aukrust (1920–2002) a Norwegian author, humourist, poet and artist, the Huset Aukrust, (Norwegian Wiki) is dedicated to him. He  is famous for creating the fictional Norwegian village of Flåklypa and its cast of idiosyncratic characters.
 Ola Jonsmoen (born 1932) a Norwegian educator, poet, novelist and children's writer
 Svein Borkhus (born 1955) a Norwegian politician, Mayor of Alvdal 1999-2007
 Olov Grøtting (born 1960) a Norwegian politician, Mayor of Alvdal 2007-2011
 Anne Nørdsti (born 1977) a Norwegian dansband singer, influenced by country music

Sport 
 Per Samuelshaug (1905–1990) a Norwegian cross-country skier, participated at the 1936 Winter Olympics
 Kristian Bjørn (1919–1993) a Norwegian cross-country skier, competed at the 1948 Winter Olympics
 Torgeir Bjørn (born 1964) a retired Norwegian cross-country skier, competed at the 1988 Winter Olympics
 Harald Stormoen (born 1980) a retired Norwegian footballer with over 200 club caps

References

External links

Municipal fact sheet from Statistics Norway 

 
Municipalities of Innlandet
1864 establishments in Norway